Andrew Ladd McConkey (born November 11, 2001) is an American football wide receiver for the Georgia Bulldogs.

High school career 
McConkey attended North Murray High School in Chatsworth, Georgia. He made the varsity team as a freshman. McConkey was an athlete as he played quarterback, running back, defensive back, punter, and he was also a return specialist. McConkey was a three-star recruit and committed to the University of Georgia on February 2, 2020.

College career 
McConkey redshirted and was initially a member of Georgia's scout team.

In McConkey's redshirt freshman year, he caught five touchdowns with 28 receptions for 430 yards. His first career touchdown came against Vanderbilt. McConkey also rushed for one touchdown. He was named the SEC Freshman of the Week after the 34-10 win over Auburn, where he received 135 yards and scored one touchdown. McConkey played in all of Georgia's games making seven starts.

McConkey scored two touchdowns, one receiving, and one rushing, against Oregon in the 2022 season opener. Against Kent State, McConkey recorded a career high six receptions. He would score a touchdown against Florida before tallying a season-high 94 yards in the game of the century against Tennessee. The following week against Mississippi State, McConkey would rush for a 70-yard touchdown while also adding a 17-yard receiving touchdown.

He left the SEC Championship Game against LSU on December 3, 2022, due to knee tendinitis.

In the 2023 College Football Playoff National Championship Game, McConkey recorded five receptions for 88 yards and two touchdowns in a 65–7 victory.

Personal life 
A middle child, McConkey grew up a fan of the Tennessee Volunteers. His father, Benji McConkey, was a star quarterback in high school at Dalton High, while his brother, Hinton McConkey, played quarterback for the University of West Georgia in Division II in 2018. McConkey writes "1-20-16" on his towel before games to honor his late grandfather Vic McConkey.

References

External links 

 Georgia Bulldogs bio

Living people
Georgia Bulldogs football players
People from Chatsworth, Georgia
2001 births
American football wide receivers